Cadherin-4 is a protein that in humans is encoded by the CDH4 gene.

This gene is a classical cadherin from the cadherin superfamily. The encoded protein is a calcium-dependent cell-cell adhesion glycoprotein composed of five extracellular cadherin repeats, a transmembrane region and a highly conserved cytoplasmic tail. Based on studies in chicken and mouse, this cadherin is thought to play an important role during brain segmentation and neuronal outgrowth. In addition, a role in kidney and muscle development is indicated. Of particular interest are studies showing stable cis-heterodimers of cadherins 2 and 4 in cotransfected cell lines. Previously thought to interact in an exclusively homophilic manner, this is the first evidence of cadherin heterodimerization.

Interactions
Cadherin-4 has been shown to interact with:

PTPmu

References

Further reading

External links